The Asian badger (Meles leucurus), also known as the sand badger, is a species of badger native to Mongolia, China, Kazakhstan, Kyrgyzstan, the Korean Peninsula and Russia.

Characteristics

The Asian badger is mostly lighter in colour than the European badger, though some forms may closely approach the former in colour, if not darker, with smudges of ocherous and brownish highlights. The flanks are lighter than the middle of the back, and the facial stripes are usually brown rather than black. The facial stripes narrow behind the eyes and extend above the ears. The white parts of the head are usually dirtier in colour than those of the European badger. The light stripe passing along the top of the head between the two stripes is relatively short and narrow. The Asian badger is generally smaller than the European badger and has relatively longer upper molars. It appears to be the smallest of the three Meles badgers despite regional size variations, with the largest-bodied populations in Siberia.

Taxonomy
Five subspecies are recognized.

Distribution and habitat
Asian badgers have a large range including the southern portion of Russia east of the Urals, Kazakhstan, Mongolia, China, and Korea. The species can be found within areas of high elevation (perhaps up to ) in the Ural Mountains, the Tian Shan mountains, and the Tibetan Plateau. The ranges of Asian and European badgers are separated in places by the Volga River. Asian badgers prefer open deciduous woodland and adjacent pastureland, but also inhabit coniferous and mixed woodlands, scrub and steppe. They are sometimes found in suburban areas.

Threats
Asian badgers are legally hunted in China, Russia and Mongolia, as well as illegally within protected areas in China. Russia's established badger hunting season usually takes place from August to November.

In Mongolian traditional medicine, balm made from badger fat oil is used as a remedy for variety of ailments and diseases such as pulmonary tuberculosis, pneumonia, bronchitis, stomach ulcer, inflammatory diseases of the kidney, intestinal diseases and colds.

References

Bibliography

Badgers
Mammals of Asia
Mammals of Russia
Mammals of China
Mammals of Mongolia
Mammals of Central Asia
Mammals described in 1847